Super Daddy Yeol is a 2015 South Korean television series starring Lee Dong-gun, Lee Yu-ri and Lee Re. Based on the same-titled Daum webtoon by Lee Sang-hoon and Jin Hyo-mi, it aired on tvN from March 13 to May 2, 2015 on Fridays and Saturdays at 20:30 for 16 episodes.

Plot
Cha Mi-rae is a doctor and single mother to her young daughter Sa-rang. When she gets diagnosed with terminal cancer and told she has one year left to live, she seeks out her ex-boyfriend Han Yeol, a former baseball player. Mi-rae and Yeol were a couple a decade ago, but she broke up with him to study abroad and because she didn't think much of his prospects. Soon after, a serious injury forced him to retire from the sport, and Yeol became the rehabilitation coach of a major league baseball team. Mi-rae is determined to transform still-single, grungy, irritable Yeol into the best father possible for her daughter.

Cast
 Lee Dong-gun as Han Yeol
 Lee Yu-ri as Cha Mi-rae
 Lee Re as Cha Sa-rang
 Seo Jun-young as Shin Woo-hyuk
 Seo Yea-ji as Hwang Ji-hye
 Kang Nam-gil as Han Man-ho
 Kim Mi-kyung as Hwang Ji-woo
 Lee Han-wi as Choi Nak-kwon
 Jang Gwang as  Coach Bang
 Choi Min as Ryu Hyun-woo
 Park Joo-hyung as Uhm Ki-tae
 Choi Dae-chul as Shiksanghae (Shim Sang-hae)
 Jung Ji-ah as Jang Shi-eun
 Choi Kwon-soo as Lee Min-woo
 Lee Young-eun as Uhm Bo-mi
 Oh Joo-eun as Chae Yu-ra
 Kim Hye-na as Min Mang-hae
 Han Young as Teacher
 Han Groo as Laura Jang (cameo, episodes 8-9)

References

External links
 

Super Daddy Yeol webtoon 

TVN (South Korean TV channel) television dramas
2015 South Korean television series debuts
Korean-language television shows
South Korean romantic comedy television series
Baseball television series
Television series about cancer
Television shows based on South Korean webtoons
South Korean romance television series
South Korean comedy television series